Tapiria Wildlife Refuge, is a protected area in Costa Rica, managed under the Central Conservation Area, it was created in 2011 by decree 36681-MINAET.

References 

Nature reserves in Costa Rica
Protected areas established in 2011
2011 establishments in Costa Rica